Nemophas is a genus of longhorn beetles of the subfamily Lamiinae, containing the following species:

 Nemophas ammiralis Schwarzer, 1931
 Nemophas batoceroides Thomson, 1864
 Nemophas bennigseni Aurivillius, 1908
 Nemophas bicinctus Lansberge, 1880
 Nemophas cyanescens Jordan, 1898
 Nemophas forbesi Waterhouse, 1884
 Nemophas grayii (Pascoe, 1859)
 Nemophas helleri Hauser, 1904
 Nemophas incensus Pascoe, 1866
 Nemophas leuciscus Pascoe, 1866
 Nemophas nigriceps Vitali, 2013
 Nemophas ramosi Schultze, 1920
 Nemophas rosenbergii Ritsema, 1881
 Nemophas subterrubens Heller, 1924
 Nemophas sumbaensis Vitali, 2013
 Nemophas tomentosus (Buquet, 1859)
 Nemophas tricolor Heller, 1896
 Nemophas trifasciatus Heller, 1919
 Nemophas websteri Jordan, 1898
 Nemophas zonatus Lansberge, 1880

References

 
Lamiini